The women's 100 metre breaststroke event at the 2012 Summer Olympics took place on 29–30 July at the London Aquatics Centre in London, United Kingdom.

At only 15 years of age, Rūta Meilutytė defeated a vastly more sophisticated field to become Lithuania's first ever gold medalist in swimming under its own banner. Dominating the race from the start, she pulled away from the field to an unexpected triumph in a sterling time of 1:05.47. U.S. top favorite and reigning world champion Rebecca Soni held on a sprint challenge from the Lithuanian teen at the halfway turn, but ended up defending her silver instead from Beijing four years earlier in 1:05.55. Meanwhile, Satomi Suzuki powered home with the bronze in 1:06.46, handing Japan its first ever medal in the event's history.

Jamaica's Alia Atkinson raced on the outside lane after her swim-off triumph over Canada's Tera van Beilen in the semifinals, but narrowly missed the podium with a fourth-place time in 1:06.93. Competing in her fourth Olympics as Australia's first ever swimmer, defending Olympic champion Leisel Jones finished fifth in a credible time of 1:06.96 to end her illustrious career with a full set of medals.

U.S. swimmer Breeja Larson escaped from a "no false-start" rule to pull off a sixth-place finish in 1:06.96, as the issue of her pre-race jump came with a faulty starting system. Russia's Yuliya Yefimova (1:06.98) and Denmark's Rikke Pedersen (1:07.55) rounded out the field.

Records
Prior to this competition, the existing world and Olympic records were as follows.

Results

Heats

Semifinals

Semifinal 1

Semifinal 2

Semifinal swim-off

Final

* False start, but she was not disqualified due to technical error.

References

External links
NBC Olympics Coverage

Women's 00100 metre breaststroke
2012 in women's swimming
Women's events at the 2012 Summer Olympics